William Whitcomb "Bill" Quillian (April 13, 1934 – July 12, 1973) was an American tennis player and coach.

Quillian joined the University of Washington in Seattle as an undergrad in 1952. He played tennis throughout his time there, participating in the U.S. championships in 1952, 1953, 1954, 1955, 1956, 1957, and 1958. In 1958, he competed in Europe at the Wimbledon Championships and French Championships. Quillian played for the U.S. in the 1958 Davis Cup against Venezuela; at the quarterfinal of the Americas zone in Caracas in May, he won his doubles and singles match.

Quillian was a coach from 1965, until his death in 1973 at the age of 39 from leukemia. The outdoor tennis stadium at the University of Washington was renamed The Bill Quillian Stadium in his honor. He was inducted into the University of Washington Hall of Fame in 1985.

Grand Slam finals

Doubles (1 runner-up)

References

External links
 
 
 
 USTA Pacific Northwest Hall of Fame Biography 
 University of Washington Athletics – Bill Quillian

1934 births
1973 deaths
American male tennis players
American tennis coaches
Tennis people from Washington (state)
Washington Huskies men's tennis coaches
Washington Huskies men's tennis players